Ivan Vyhovsky (date of birth unknown, died 1664), a Ukrainian military and political figure and statesman, served as hetman of the Zaporizhian Host and of the Cossack Hetmanate for three years (1657–1659) during the Russo-Polish War (1654–1667). He succeeded the famous hetman and rebel leader Bohdan Khmelnytsky (see Hetmans of Ukrainian Cossacks).  His time as hetman was characterized by his generally pro-Polish policies, which led to his defeat by  pro-Russian elements among the Cossacks.

Vyhovsky belonged to the Orthodox noble family of the Vyhovsky coat of arms  Abdank.

Origin and family
Vyhovsky was born in his family estate of Vyhiv, near Ovruch in the Kyiv Voivodeship of the Polish–Lithuanian Commonwealth, a son of Ostap Vyhovsky, a vicegerent of Kyiv fortress under voivode Adam Kisiel and an Orthodox nobleman from the Kyiv region. There is also a possibility that the birth occurred at another family estate, Hoholiv, located near Kyiv (now Brovary Raion). Ostap Vyhovsky had 3 other sons and a daughter (all of them were exiled to Siberia after the downfall of Ivan Vyhovsky).

Education
Ivan Vyhovsky studied at the Kyiv Brotherhood Collegium, and excelled in languages (including Church Slavonic, Polish, Latin and Russian, in addition to Ukrainian) and calligraphy. He later was the main financial supporter of the Collegium.

Military service
In Polish military service, he was captured by Khmelnystsky's rebel Cossack forces at the Battle of Zhovti Vody in May 1648, he was freed on account of his education and experience and rose to become secretary-general or chancellor (heneralny pysar) of the Cossacks and one of Khmelnytsky's closest advisors.

Elected hetman upon the death of Khmelnytsky, Vyhovsky sought to find a counterbalance to the pervasive Russian influence present in Ukraine after the 1654 Treaty of Pereyaslav. While the Cossack elite and the ecclesiastical authorities supported this pro-Polish orientation, the masses and the Cossack rank-and-file remained deeply suspicious and resentful of the Poles, by whom they had long been forced into serfdom. As a result, some Cossacks, led by Iakiv Barabash, put forward an alternative candidate for the hetmancy in Martyn Pushkar, the colonel of the Poltava regiment of Cossacks. The rebellion against the hetman grew, and came to a head when Vyhovsky's forces clashed with the pro-Russian Cossacks in June 1658. Vyhovsky's forces prevailed, killing Pushkar and forcing Barabash to flee (he would later be captured and executed). However, it had clearly been a fratricidal conflict, resulting in some 50,000 deaths.

Following his consolidation of power within Ukraine, Vyhovsky attempted to reach an acceptable agreement with the Poles. Encouraged by his aristocratic friend Yuri Nemyrych, Vyhovsky entered negotiations with the Polish government, which resulted in the Treaty of Hadiach, signed on 16 September 1658. Under the conditions of the treaty, Ukraine as the Grand Duchy of Ruthenia, would become a third and autonomous component of the Polish–Lithuanian Commonwealth, under the ultimate sovereignty of the King of Poland, but with its own military, courts, and treasury. Additionally, adherents of the Orthodox faith were to receive equal consideration as Catholics. As such, the treaty as signed would have assured the Cossacks of autonomy and dignity to an extent they had not known for centuries.

However, the Treaty of Hadiach was never implemented. Following its signing, a massive Russian army (according to some sources up to 150,000 soldiers; about 100,000 of them were occupied by the siege of Konotop, the rest were massacred by Tatars when trying to follow after Vyhovsky's cossacks, resulting in 20 000-30 000 lost among the Russians) led by the Muscovy boyar Aleksei Trubetskoi crossed into Ukraine. In response, Vyhovsky led 60,000 Cossacks against the Russians alongside his Polish and 40,000 Tatar allies. Near Konotop, the Russians were defeated. However, Vyhovsky was not able to capitalize on this victory, as the Russian garrisons in several Cossack towns continued to hold out and his Tatar allies were forced to return to the Crimea when it was attacked by independent Cossacks. Furthermore, pro-Russia unrest led by Ivan Bohun broke out again amongst the Cossacks. In 1659, faced with a second rebellion against his rule and unable to master the dangerous and chaotic forces vying for power in Ukraine, Vyhovsky surrendered the office of hetman and retired to Poland. In 1660, he was appointed Voivode of Kiev, a position he kept until his death in 1664. Kiev itself was held by the Russian troops in this period, after voivodes Vasily Sheremetev and Yuri Baryatinsky managed to repel two Vyhovsky's and one Polish assault on the city.

Unfortunately for Vyhovsky, his service on behalf of the Polish–Lithuanian Commonwealth and his willing surrender of power did not protect him, and in 1664, another Cossack hetman, Pavlo Teteria, seeing in Vyhovsky a potential rival, accused him of treason and betrayal (reconciliation with Russia and Russian followers amongst the Cossacks) before the Polish authorities. Consequently, Vyhovsky was charged with treason, arrested and executed without trial by the Polish commander colonel Sebastian Machowski, making him another victim of the fratricidal power struggles that devastated Ukrainian territory in the latter half of the 17th century.

Legacy 
In few cities of Ukraine there is Ivan Vyhovsky Street. In particular, in the city of Kyiv

See also
 List of Ukrainian rulers

References
 
 "Vyhovsky" at Encyclopedia of Ukraine

See also

Year of birth unknown
1664 deaths
People from Zhytomyr Oblast
People from Kiev Voivodeship
Clan Abdank
Ruthenian nobility
Zaporozhian Cossack nobility
Chancellors General of the Cossack Hetmanate
Hetmans of Zaporizhian Host
17th-century Ukrainian people
National University of Kyiv-Mohyla Academy alumni
Polish people of the Russo-Polish War (1654–1667)
Ukrainian people of Polish descent